Itale may refer to:
Italé, a neighbourhood in Nigeria
Itale (Aeolis), a town of ancient Aeolis, now in Turkey
Itale, Tanzania,  a subdistrict in Ileje District, Tanzania